Chlamydotheca is a genus of freshwater ostracods in the family Cyprididae. About 36 species are known to occur throughout continental waters. Four species are found in Argentina.

Taxonomy
Once classified as Chlamydotheca australis is now accepted as a synonym for Bennelongia australis.

Species
 Chlamydotheca azteca de Saussure, 1858
 Chlamydotheca elegans Roessler, 1986
 Chlamydotheca incisa Claus, 1892
 Chlamydotheca barbadensis Sharpe, 1910
 Chlamydotheca unispinosa (Baird, 1862) 
 Chlamydotheca iheringi (Sars, 1901) Klie, 1931
 Chlamydotheca incisa (Claus, 1982)
 Chlamydotheca leuckarti 
 Chlamydotheca symmetrica 
 Chlamydotheca arcuata (Sars, 1901)
 Chlamydotheca llanoensis†

References

External links 

 
 Chlamydotheca at insectoid.info
 Chlamydotheca at the World Register of marine Species (WoRMS)
 Toxicities of aldrin and dieldrin to the freshwater ostracod Chlamydotheca arcuata.
 Postembryonic development of nonmarine ostracod Chlamydotheca arcuata (Sars, 1901) (Crustacea: Ostracoda), reared in the laboratory

Cyprididae
Podocopida genera